This is a list of earthquakes in 1982. Only earthquakes of magnitude 6 or above are included, unless they result in damage and/or casualties, or are notable for some other reason. Events in remote areas will not be listed but included in statistics and maps. Countries are entered on the lists in order of their status in this particular year. All dates are listed according to UTC time. Maximum intensities are indicated on the Mercalli intensity scale and are sourced from United States Geological Survey (USGS) ShakeMap data. The trend of below normal activity in the early part of the 1980s continued in 1982. The mid part of the year saw the bulk of the magnitude 7.0+ events. The largest event struck El Salvador in June and measured 7.3. This was a relatively modest magnitude as normally the largest events in a year are in the high end of the magnitude 7+ range or lower end of magnitude 8+ range. The number of deadly events was subdued for most of the year in line with the activity but spiked in December. Yemen suffered its worst event with 2,800 fatalities in a magnitude 6.3 event on December 13. A few days later Afghanistan had an earthquake which left 500 people dead.

By death toll

Listed are earthquakes with at least 10 dead.

By magnitude

Listed are earthquakes with at least 7.0 magnitude.

By month

January

February

March

April

May

June

July

August

September

October

November

December

References 

1982
1982 earthquakes
1982